The 1999 Marlboro 500 Presented by Toyota was held on October 31, 1999, at Auto Club Speedway (then known as California Speedway) in Fontana, California as the final showdown of the 1999 CART World Series season. The race was marred by an accident in the early stages of the race which killed Forsythe Racing driver Greg Moore.

The race was broadcast on ESPN with Paul Page doing play-by-play and Parker Johnstone as the color commentator. Gary Gerould and Jon Beekhuis were in the pits.

Adrian Fernandez, driving the Tecate/Quaker State Ford for Patrick Racing, won the race. It was his second victory of 1999 following his earlier victory at Twin Ring Motegi in Japan and the fifth of his career. It was also the second time that Fernandez won a race where another driver was killed; he won the 1996 Molson Indy Toronto street course event that saw Jeff Krosnoff lost his life.

Background

Championship battle 
The championship entering the race was still to be decided. The two contenders were Dario Franchitti, driver of the #27 Kool Cigarettes Reynard Honda for Team Green, and rookie Juan Pablo Montoya, driving the #4 Target Reynard Honda for Chip Ganassi Racing. Franchitti had just won the previous race at Surfers Paradise and held a nine-point lead in the season points standings over Montoya, who wrecked out and scored no points.

End of several eras 

The season finale was also going to mark several significant lasts in CART, as significant upheaval was in the works for 2000. 

Among the changes taking effect:

Al Unser Jr., the two-time former Indianapolis 500 winner, and Penske Racing stalwart was running his last race for the team. Both of Penske’s cars were going to be filled with new drivers for 2000, as the team signed Gil de Ferran and Greg Moore to take those positions. 
Scott Pruett decided to join the NASCAR circuit full-time in 2000 for PPI Motorsports, which was owned by his CART team owner Cal Wells. 
Hogan Racing was one of several teams shutting their doors; this left its young driver Helio Castroneves without a ride.
Goodyear also left due to the costly feud between the Indy Racing League and Championship Auto Racing Teams.

Qualifying 
Scott Pruett won the pole for the race, his 5th and final career pole in CART, his only one of the season, and also for the team. His fastest lap had an average speed of 235.398 miles per hour. The championship contenders Montoya qualified 3rd and Franchitti in 8th. Greg Moore was the only driver that did not make a qualifying run, thus starting at the rear of the field. Moore was not even certain to be in the race due to an accident in the paddock area the weekend before the race, where he was hit by a vehicle while riding his motor scooter. Moore suffered a broken hand in the incident and his team, Forsythe Racing, hired Roberto Moreno (who had served as replacement for both Christian Fittipaldi and Mark Blundell after both suffered injuries earlier in the season) as an emergency backup driver if Moore could not run the entire race. After a medical consultation, and an in-car test, he was allowed to race using a hand brace and had the pain dulled with an injection of medicine.

Qualification Results 
The championship contenders are in bold

Race highlights 
Pruett led the way in his final CART appearance, but he would not hold the lead for long as he dropped back and fell out of the race later on, while Michael Andretti took control at the start. Two laps later, Richie Hearn in his final CART race, spun in turn and struck the inside wall; he would walk away.  Alex Barron crashed out of the event on the 27th lap; that was the final accident of the event.  After leading all but nine of the first seventy-one laps, Andretti's car suffered a fire during his second pit stop, which dropped him out of contention. Dario Franchitti, who was in a championship battle with Juan Pablo Montoya, also had difficulties on pit road; he fell off the pace when his first pit stop led to an improperly fitted right rear wheel, and the replacement tires had incorrect pressure. Raul Boesel, who was running his 3rd race of the season, fell out with an engine blown as he completed 164 laps, this race turned out to be his last of his 173 starts, leaving him with the most starts to never win a CART race.  Max Papis led the Marlboro 500 for 111 laps but was forced to make a pit stop near the end for fuel. Adrián Fernández would take the lead and held him off to get the win after successfully stretching his fuel supply to avoid a late pit stop. Fernandez finished the race approximately seven seconds in front of Papis.  

Juan Pablo Montoya and Franchitti ended up in a tie with 212 points. Franchitti had scored more podiums but Montoya won the title by having the most wins with seven to Franchitti's three. The championship was also Chip Ganassi Racing its fourth straight title with three drivers (also including Jimmy Vasser in 1996 and Alex Zanardi in 1997–1998.

Greg Moore fatal accident on lap 9 
As he began lap 9, Greg Moore lost control of his car in almost the same area where Richie Hearn had earlier. Hearn was able to slow his car significantly and it came to rest in the backstretch grass near a retaining wall. He emerged uninjured, but finished in last place. 

Moore's accident, however, was much worse. He had been traveling at race speed when he lost control of his car. The #99 ran off the track and into the same grassy area where Hearn had wrecked, but instead of skidding along like Hearn had Moore's car became airborne and he struck an inner retaining wall that Hearn had managed to avoid; the car struck the wall nearly fully inverted and hit with enough force to disintegrate the vehicle on impact which split the car in half. What was left of the car began rolling across the grass and came to rest, upside down, several feet away. The caution flag was immediately thrown and stayed out for an extended period while work began at the crash scene. 

The track safety crew was on the scene almost immediately along with CART series medical director Steve Olvey and an ambulance. Moore was extricated from the remains of the #99 and Olvey called for an airlift. A Medevac helicopter with Loma Linda University Medical Center trauma surgeon Jeff Grange landed at the speedway and Moore was taken from the track. 

The first major update on the ongoing situation was given to Gary Gerould of ESPN as Lap 42 of the race was beginning. Olvey stated that Moore had suffered massive injury to his head and internal organs, that doctors were making significant effort to resuscitate him at the hospital, and that he was awaiting a report from Grange on further information. Before leaving, Olvey said that the injuries Moore suffered were potentially life-threatening. 

At 1:20 PM Pacific, doctors at the hospital pronounced Moore dead from his injuries. He was 24 years old when he died and was the second driver to die in the season; Penske Racing driver Gonzalo Rodríguez had been killed in a practice crash at Laguna Seca Raceway just three races earlier. Word of Moore's death eventually reached Fontana and Olvey, who at 2:07 PM Pacific relayed the news of Moore's death to Gerould and the worldwide television audience. 

Upon the announcement, CART steward Wally Dallenbach Sr. instructed track officials to lower the flags flying in the winner's circle (the American flag, the California state flag, and the CART logo flag) to half staff. The race was not stopped, as series officials decided the best way to deal with the situation was to run the race to its conclusion. It was also decided to withhold the information about Moore from the drivers until after the event concluded. 

Once the checkered flag fell and all of the drivers completed the final lap, CART ordered all of the cars to return to their pit stalls immediately. It was there that they all learned of Moore's death, and many of them were shaken by the news. There was no postrace celebration for either Fernandez or Montoya. 

After the race, ESPN attempted to get interviews with both the series champion and the race winner. An emotional Gary Gerould talked to Montoya and his team owner Chip Ganassi, who with Montoya's title had won a fourth consecutive series title; both men relayed their condolences to Moore's family and gave more muted statements on their accomplishments. Once Fernandez climbed from his car and heard the news, Jon Beekhuis reported that he broke down in tears almost immediately and was not willing to speak to anyone; Fernandez did eventually grant an interview in the post race press conference but was still in significant emotional distress. Some of the drivers and teams gathered in a room in the infield facilities for a prayer, and a service was conducted by one of the series chaplains on pit road for the fans in attendance, many of which chose to stay after the race concluded. 

An investigation of the fatal crash said the fatal head injury was caused because the car had flown into the wall with Moore's head smashing into the barrier first at a specific angle. The investigation confirmed that had the car hit the wall differently than Moore's head hitting the wall first, he would have survived.

This event was to be Moore's last with Forsythe Racing, as he was signed to fill an open seat at Penske for 2000 and was to team with Gil de Ferran of Walker Racing, who signed on to replace Al Unser Jr. in the Penske stable. Moore was replaced by Hélio Castroneves, who was losing his ride at the end of the year when Hogan Racing ceased operations. Castroneves remained with Team Penske until 2020, when he signed with Arrow McLaren SP and later Meyer Shank Racing.

For safety reasons, International Speedway Corporation paved over the runoff area that Moore had his accident in and later paved over the entire backstretch.

Legacy 
Moore would end up finishing in 10th in the final points standings but soon after his death, the number 99 would be retired by CART in honor of him.  Fellow drivers paid tribute to this day, including Dario Franchitti who was one of Moore's best friends when he won at Vancouver in 2002.  Franchitti did so again he won the 2009 IndyCar Series title and the season finale at Homestead-Miami Speedway, where Moore won his final CART victory in the same year of his death. Max Papis to this day still wears red gloves in honor of Moore who wore red gloves during his career.

Race results 

‡ - Denotes Pole Sitter and earns one point

Final standings 
Juan Pablo Montoya and Dario Franchitti ended up tied with 212 points each, Montoya winning the tiebreaker due to his higher number of wins that season with seven.  This rare occurrence would happen again in IndyCar in 2006 as another Ganassi Racing driver, Dan Wheldon, and Penske Racing's Sam Hornish Jr. had 475 points each and Hornish Jr. won the tiebreaker with the most wins at the end. In 2015, Montoya (driving for Penske) would lose the IndyCar championship in a tiebreaker to his former team with Scott Dixon clinching his fourth title after winning at Sonoma Raceway to earn a series-leading third win of the season. This also happened previously in the 1996 Indy Racing League season, when Buzz Calkins and Scott Sharp were tied with 246 points. But on that occasion, they were co-champions and only held three events. The NASCAR Cup Series has only had this scenario play out once, in 2011 when Tony Stewart and Carl Edwards were tied in points (2403) but Stewart won that championship due to 5 races compared to Edwards 1 victory.

References

External links 
1999 Marlboro 500 Results
CART Fontana 1999
Race results on Motorsport.com
10 Years Later: Remembering Greg Moore
Greg Moore's Fatal Crash *Live*
Greg Moore: What Might Have Been

Marlboro 500
Marlboro 500, 1999
MAVTV 500
Marlboro 500